Kevin Joseph Costello FRS is an Irish mathematician, since 2014 the 
Krembil Foundation's William Rowan Hamilton chair of theoretical physics at the Perimeter Institute in Waterloo, Ontario, Canada.

Education
Costello was educated at the University of Cambridge where he was awarded a PhD in 2003 for research on Gromov–Witten invariants supervised by Ian Grojnowski.

Career and research 
Costello works in the field of mathematical physics, particularly in the mathematical foundations of perturbative quantum field theory and the applications of topological and conformal field theories to other areas of mathematics.  In the book Renormalization and Effective Field Theory he introduced a rigorous mathematical formalism for the renormalization group flow formalism of Kenneth Wilson and proved the renormalizability of Yang–Mills theory in this framework.

More recent work on formalism for quantum field theory uses the idea of a factorization algebra to describe the local structure of quantum observables, such as the operator product expansion for conformal field theories.  Using this language, Costello gave a rigorous construction of the Witten genus in elliptic cohomology, using a variant of Chern–Simons theory.
Along with Davide Gaiotto, Kevin Costello was one of two researchers appointed to named chairs by the Perimeter Institute in 2014, funded by a $4 million investment by the Krembil Foundation.  Costello's appointment was praised by Fields medalists Maxim Kontsevich and Edward Witten.

Publications

 Kevin Costello and Owen Gwilliam, Factorization Algebras in Quantum Field Theory, Cambridge University Press, 2014

Awards and honours
Costello was elected a Fellow of the Royal Society (FRS) in 2018. He was awarded the Berwick Prize by the London Mathematical Society in 2017. In 2020 he was admitted as an honorary member of the Royal Irish Academy.

References 

Year of birth missing (living people)
Living people
Irish mathematicians
Alumni of the University of Cambridge
Members of the Royal Irish Academy
Northwestern University faculty